Strazhitsa is a town in northeastern Bulgaria, part of Veliko Tarnovo Province. It is the administrative centre of the homonymous Strazhitsa Municipality, which lies in the eastern part of the Province. The town is located in the central Danubian Plain, not far from the Balkan Mountains, 45 kilometres northeast of the provincial capital of Veliko Tarnovo. As of December 2009, it has a population of 5,170 inhabitants.

Strazhitsa has a railway station on the Sofia-Varna railway line, located some 33 km from the railway station of Popovo and some 27 km from the railway station of Gorna Oryahovitsa.

The town was badly damaged by an earthquake with a magnitude of 5.7 on 7 December 1986. Strazhitsa has an art gallery, an Eastern Orthodox church dedicated to the Dormition of the Mother of God, as well as a museum of local history. Strazhitsa's name comes from the Bulgarian root strazh (страж), meaning "guard".

Municipality

 Asenovo
 Balkantsi
 Blagoevo
 Bryagovitsa
 Gorski Senovets
 Kamen
 Kavlak
 Kesarevo
 Lozen
 Lyubentsi
 Mirovo
 Nikolaevo
 Novo Gradishte
 Nova Varbovka
 Strazhitsa
 Sushitsa
 Temenuga
 Tsarski Izvor
 Vinograd
 Vladislav
 Vodno
 Zhelezartsi

References

External links
 Strazhitsa municipality website 
 SOU"Angel Karaliichev" Strazhitsa

Towns in Bulgaria
Populated places in Veliko Tarnovo Province